Marin Čilić was the defending champion, but withdrew with a knee injury before the tournament began.
Tommy Robredo won the title, defeating Fabio Fognini in the final, 6–0, 6–3.

Seeds
The top four seeds receive a bye into the second round.

Draw

Finals

Top half

Bottom half

Qualifying

Seeds

Qualifiers

Qualifying draw

First qualifier

Second qualifier

Third qualifier

Fourth qualifier

References
 Main Draw
 Qualifying Draw

ATP Vegeta Croatia Open Umag - Singles
2013 Singles